Tale of Us is an Italian music production and DJ duo consisting of Carmine Conte and Matteo Milleri. They are based in Berlin, Germany.

Biography
Carmine Conte was born in Toronto and Matteo Milleri in New York. They both moved to Italy at a young age and met in Milan in 2008 while studying sound engineering at the SAE Institute. They relocated to Berlin and began recording music together. Their debut EP Dark Song was released in 2011. They followed this up with Another Earth in 2013 and North Star/Silent Space in 2015, and in 2017, the group signed with Deutsche Grammophon and released its first full-length album, titled Endless.

DJ Mag named the duo one of the top 100 alternative DJs in 2018.

In 2018, the group was featured in the Grand Theft Auto Online DLC After Hours update.

Discography
Albums
 Endless (2017)
 Endless Remixes (2017)

EPs
 Dark Song (2011)
 Another Earth (2013)
 North Star / Silent Space (2015)

Split EPs
 Fresh Water with the/Das (2013)
 Concor with Vaal (2014)
 Monument with Vaal (2017)

Singles
 "Astral" with Mind Against (2015)
 "Monument Remixes" with Vaal (2017)

References

External links
 Tale of Us on Discogs
 Tale of Us artist site at Deutsche Grammophon

Italian musical duos
Italian electronic music groups
Musical groups from Milan
Deutsche Grammophon artists